Le p'tit Parigot (The Small Parisian One) is a 1926 French movie serial in six parts.

It was directed by René Le Somptier and starred Georges Biscot. Costume design was by Sonia Delaunay.

part 1: "Premiere Partie" (1h14min)
part 2: "La Belle Inconnue" (33min)
part 3: "Le Complot" (36min)
part 4: "Le Mystere du Val d'Enfer" (34min)
part 5: "Zarka la Sorciere" (33min)
part 6: "La Loi des Jeunes" (30min)

Cast
(incomplete list)

Notes and references

External links

1926 films
French black-and-white films
Film serials
French silent feature films
1920s French films